Storyville was a Boston jazz nightclub organized by Boston-native, jazz promoter and producer George Wein during the 1940s.

WNAC at Hotel Buckminster
In 1929, WNAC Radio moved to new studios inside the Hotel and remained for the next four decades. An FM station was added in the late 1930s. In June, 1948, WNAC-TV began broadcasting from the Hotel. Until 1968, WNAC operated an AM, FM and television station in the hotel basement.

"Compared to the other clubs in town, listening to a jazz musician at Storyville is like sitting at home with a pair of earphones"— Nat Hentoff, 1953 (WMEX Announcer, host of Storyville broadcasts

Recordings 
Many jazz legends made live radio broadcasts from the club, especially at the Hotel Buckminster, and many audio recordings from these sessions are still available.
 Dave Brubeck
 John Coltrane
 Ella Fitzgerald
 Stan Getz
 Billie Holiday
 Charles Mingus
 Gerry Mulligan Quartet 
 Charlie Parker (de)(Provided to YouTube by Universal Music Group)
 Sarah Vaughan

Performers 
A number of notable jazz musicians, performed in this venue, including: 
 Louis Armstrong 
 Duke Ellington
 William "Red" Garland 
 Erroll Garner, 
 Jazz Messengers  
 Pee Wee Russell 
 Al Vega Trio,

Chronology 
Originally a jazz club, it was named after Storyville district of New Orleans.  It was first located in the 1940s at the Copley Square Hotel, but soon relocated to Harvard Square.

In 1950 it was relocated again to the ground floor of the Hotel Buckminster in Kenmore Square.

In 1953, Storyville was relocated to the Copley Square Hotel, at street level.

In 1959, Storyville moved to the Bradford Hotel on Tremont St. for one year.

In the 1970s, under the glow of the historic Citgo sign, Kenmore Square, Storyville was located nearThe Rathskeller, Where It’s At, Lucifer’s, and Psychedelic Supermarket.

In 1983 and 1984, at 645 Beacon Street, Storyville hosted performers such as the Del Fuegos, Bush Tetras, Til Tuesday, Barrence Whitfield & the Savages, and the Violent Femmes.

Present day Locations
The space that housed Storyville at Hotel Buckminster in Kenmore Square is now occupied by a Pizzeria Uno restaurant.

In September 2011, at the Copley Square Hotel, a new nightclub opened, using the name Storyville, 90 Exeter Street.

See also
 George Wein
 Storyville Records (George Wein's)

References

External links 
 

Buildings and structures in Boston
Cultural history of Boston
Defunct nightclubs in the United States
Music venues in Boston
Jazz clubs in the United States
Music venues completed in 1950
Jazz clubs in Boston